The WWA World Lightweight Championship (Campeonato Mundial de peso Ligero WWA in Spanish) is an inactive professional wrestling championship promoted by the Mexican wrestling promotion World Wrestling Association (WWA) from 1987 until 1995. It was first won by Mano Negra in 1987 and defended throughout Mexico until 1995 when the title was first declared vacant and then later on inactive.

As it was a professional wrestling championship, the championship was not won not by actual competition, but by a scripted ending to a match determined by the bookers and match makers. On occasion the promotion declares a championship vacant, which means there is no champion at that point in time. This can either be due to a storyline, or real life issues such as a champion suffering an injury being unable to defend the championship, or leaving the company.

Title history

Footnotes

References

External links
W.W.A. World Lightweight Title (Mexico)

Lightweight wrestling championships
World Wrestling Association (Mexico) Championships
World professional wrestling championships